Pleasant View is a historic home located near Forest, Bedford County, Virginia. It was built about 1840, and is a two-story, five bay, brick dwelling in the Classical Revival style.  It features Greek Revival style decorative details, front doors on both the first and second floors, plastered recessed panels between the floor levels, and a typical side-gable roof with wood cornice. Also on the property are a contributing late-19th century frame smokehouse, the remaining half of a "saddlebag" kitchen/quarters building, and a family cemetery.

It was listed on the National Register of Historic Places in 2006.

References

Houses on the National Register of Historic Places in Virginia
Greek Revival houses in Virginia
Neoclassical architecture in Virginia
Houses completed in 1840
Houses in Bedford County, Virginia
National Register of Historic Places in Bedford County, Virginia
1840 establishments in Virginia